The 2018–19 Texas Tech Red Raiders basketball team represented Texas Tech University in the 2018–19 NCAA Division I men's basketball season as a member of the Big 12 Conference. The Red Raiders were led by third-year coach Chris Beard. They played their home games at the United Supermarkets Arena in Lubbock, Texas. They finished the season 31–7, 14–4 in Big 12 play to win the Big 12 regular season title with Kansas State. They lost in the quarterfinals of the Big 12 tournament to West Virginia. They received an at-large bid to the NCAA tournament where they defeated Northern Kentucky, Buffalo, Michigan and Gonzaga to advance to their first Final Four in school history. In the Final Four they defeated Michigan State to advanced to the National Championship Game, in which they were defeated by Virginia in overtime. With 31 wins, they finished with most wins in school history.

Previous season
They finished the season 27–10, 11–7 in Big 12 play to finish in a tie for second place. They defeated Baylor in the quarterfinals of the Big 12 tournament before losing in the semifinals to West Virginia. They received an at-large bid to the NCAA tournament where they defeated Stephen F. Austin, Florida, and Purdue to advance to the Elite Eight for the first time in school history. In the Elite Eight, they were eliminated by Villanova.

Offseason

Departures

Incoming transfers

Recruits

2018 recruiting class

2019 Recruiting class

Roster

Schedule and results

|-
!colspan=12 style=|Regular season

|-
!colspan=12 style=| Big 12 Tournament

|-
!colspan=12 style=| NCAA tournament

Rankings

*AP does not release post-NCAA tournament rankings.

References

Texas Tech Red Raiders basketball seasons
Texas Tech
Texas Tech
Texas Tech
Texas Tech
NCAA Division I men's basketball tournament Final Four seasons